Baqal is the name of a remote and historic mountain settlement in Northern Ras Al Khaimah, United Arab Emirates (UAE). Inaccessible by road, it is a popular hiking destination.

The village is traditionally home to members of the mountain-dwelling Shihuh tribe (giving rise to the modern Emirati family name Al Shehhi) and has no services. Uninhabited today, many of the village's former residents and their descendants visit the village in the cooler winter months.

References

Villages in the United Arab Emirates
Populated places in the Emirate of Ras Al Khaimah